Bodega Bohemia is the fourth studio album by German synthpop band Camouflage, released on April 26, 1993 by Metronome Musik. The band moved to Hamburg and began working on the album in mid-1992 following the release of the side-project EP Areu Areu. The aim of the album was to return to an electronic presentation with as much influence from electronics as possible.

The resulting album was not promoted well by Metronome, who only released the album and its three singles in Germany. Bodega Bohemia was the band's last album for the label.

Singles
Three singles were issued from the album. The first, "Suspicious Love" was released in March 1993, followed by the second single, "Close (We Stroke the Flames)" in June. Both singles were remixed for release. A third single, "Jealousy" was released in August.

Track listing
All songs written by Camouflage.

Credits
Backing Vocals – Julie Ocean 
Design [Graphic Design] – Ingrid Albrecht 
Drum Programming [Add. Drum Loops] – Thomas Dörr 
Electric Guitar, Programmed By [Loops] – Ingo Ito 
Electronics, Sequenced By – Heiko Maile 
Photography By – Reiner Pfisterer 
Producer – Dan Lacksman, Heiko Maile 
Technician [Studio], Electronics [Machines] – Dan Lacksman 
Violin [Electronic], Performer [Add. Sounds] – Julian Boyd 
Vocals – Marcus Meyn 
℗1993 Metronome Musik GmbH, Hamburg

References

External links
Official discography

1993 albums
Camouflage (band) albums